Dimmu Borgir is a Norwegian symphonic black metal band from Jessheim, formed in 1993. The name is derived from Dimmuborgir, a volcanic formation in Iceland, the name of which means "dark cities" or "dark castles/fortresses" in Icelandic, Faroese and Old Norse. The band has been through numerous lineup changes over the years; vocalist Shagrath and rhythm guitarist Silenoz are the only original members who still remain, with lead guitarist Galder being a longstanding member.

History

For All Tid and Stormblåst period 

Dimmu Borgir was founded in 1993 by Silenoz and Tjodalv. Shagrath, Brynjard Tristan, & Stian Aarstad later joined Dimmu Borgir, and then released an EP in 1994 entitled Inn i evighetens mørke ("Into the Darkness of Eternity"). This short EP sold out within weeks, and the band followed up with the 1994 full-length album For All Tid ("For All Time"). This album featured vocal contributions by Vicotnik of Ved Buens Ende and Dødheimsgard and Aldrahn of Dødheimsgard and Zyklon-B. The initial line-up consisted of Shagrath playing drums with Tjodalv on guitar and Silenoz contributing lead vocals. This line-up changed before the release of Stormblåst ("Stormblown") on Cacophonous Records in 1996, an album considered by many to be their finest. It is also the last album which features all lyrics written and sung in Norwegian.

Enthrone Darkness Triumphant period 
After Stormblåst, keyboardist Stian Aarstad left the band due to his obligation to serve in the Norwegian army, thus being unable to participate in the 1996 recording of Devil's Path. That period was also marked by the departure of bassist Brynjard Tristan and the arrival of Nagash. Stian Aarstad returned for the recording of 1997's Enthrone Darkness Triumphant. He had trouble attending rehearsals and was unable to tour. He was then subsequently dismissed and replaced by Kimberly Goss for their 1997/1998 world tour. Enthrone Darkness Triumphant was a huge success for the band, and was their first release signed to Nuclear Blast, a German record label. The album was recorded in the Abyss Studios, owned by Hypocrisy's frontman Peter Tägtgren. After the release of Enthrone Darkness Triumphant, the band went on tour with In Flames, Dissection and other bands who were prominent in the scene at the time.

Spiritual Black Dimensions and Puritanical Euphoric Misanthropia period 
After the tour for Enthrone Darkness Triumphant, the band recruited new members Mustis on keyboards and Astennu on lead guitar. Dimmu Borgir's following full-length albums Spiritual Black Dimensions in 1999 and 2001's Puritanical Euphoric Misanthropia, both met critical acclaim. However, another line-up change occurred between the two albums; Nagash quit and was replaced by new bassist/singer ICS Vortex, and Tjodalv left due to his family commitments, and to form the subsequent band Susperia, only to be replaced with Nicholas Barker of Cradle of Filth. Astennu was fired from his guitar duties as well due to creative differences, and was replaced by Galder.

Death Cult Armageddon and Stormblåst MMV period 
Despite the regular video play on MTV2 and Fuse that their follow-up album would receive, the band stated that they were not "commercially-oriented", and instead, they "simply wished to spread their message to more people". In 2003, Dimmu Borgir recorded Death Cult Armageddon. Death Cult Armageddon was recorded with the Prague Philharmonic Orchestra, conducted by Adam Klemens. All orchestrations were arranged by Gaute Storaas (who had previously worked with Dimmu Borgir on the album Puritanical Euphoric Misanthropia). In 2004, Dimmu Borgir performed on the mainstage at Ozzfest.

In 2005, the band did a complete re-recording of the Stormblåst album, featuring Hellhammer of Mayhem fame as the session drummer. The album also featured a DVD with a live performance from the 2004 Ozzfest tour.

In Sorte Diaboli period
Dimmu Borgir's eighth studio album, In Sorte Diaboli, was released on 24 April 2007. A special edition version was released in a boxed case with a DVD, backward-printed lyrics, and a mirror. The album artwork was released on 14 February 2007 on a promotional webpage for the album. This album features once more the drumming of Hellhammer of Mayhem. Blomberg left the band in mid-tour in 2007 because of a neck injury that resulted in limited movement of his right arm. With the release of this album, Dimmu Borgir became the first black metal band with a number one album on the charts in their native country. In October 2008, they released their second live DVD set titled The Invaluable Darkness, which was based on several shows during the world tour supporting "In Sorte Diaboli".

In 2009, members ICS Vortex and Mustis independently announced their departure from Dimmu Borgir. Mustis released a statement claiming his disfavor with the band, stating that he was not properly credited for his writing contributions to the band's music, mentioning possibly taking legal action.

Dimmu Borgir soon after confirmed the pair's dismissal from the band, releasing a statement explaining why the two were fired. Shagrath, Silenoz and Galder wrote: "Funny then, how the new album is half-way finished written already by the rest of us without any of these guys' input, still having all those elements we're known for." Many fans were quite disappointed, however, without the composition of Mustis, and soaring signature voice of ICS Vortex.

Abrahadabra period

Dimmu Borgir's ninth studio album, Abrahadabra, was released on 24 September 2010 in Germany, 27 September 2010 for the rest of Europe and 12 October 2010 in North America. Silenoz explained that the growing periods of time between albums was because the band had stopped writing music while touring, which was affecting the quality of the music. He described the new album as having an "eerie and haunting feel to it", adding that the material is "epic", "primal", atmospheric and ambient. A promotional image released with the statement showed Shagrath returning to the keyboards. The album features an ensemble orchestra, the Kringkastingsorkestret (the Norwegian Broadcasting Orchestra), as well as the Schola Cantorum choir, totaling more than 100 musicians and singers.

Gaute Storaas, composer of the orchestral arrangements, released a statement on his role in working on the album. "Their music is epic, thematic and symphonic already from the creation; they are clearly having an orchestral approach to composing. My role in this is sometimes just to transcribe their themes, sometimes to take their ideas, tear them apart and build them back up in ways that are true to the band's intentions. The music must also be both interesting and playable for the musicians, and hopefully, meet the quality standards of the orchestral world."

On 8 July the band confirmed that they had tapped Swedish multi-instrumentalist Snowy Shaw (Therion, Dream Evil) to replace bassist/clean vocalist ICS Vortex on their then-upcoming album, Abrahadabra, and world tour. On 25 August it was announced that Snowy Shaw had left Dimmu Borgir to rejoin Therion. On 17 September 2010 Dimmu Borgir released the song "Born Treacherous" from Abrahadabra on their official Myspace page. Then on 24 September the band announced they would stream Abrahadabra in its entirety until 7 p.m. EST that evening. The keyboards and bass are currently played by Gerlioz from Apoptygma Berzerk and Cyrus of Susperia respectively, and the clean vocals are sampled.

28 May 2011 saw Dimmu Borgir, for the first time in the band's career, perform live with a full symphony orchestra and choir in a one-off show with the Norwegian Broadcasting Orchestra and Schola Cantorum Choir (who collaborated on Abrahadabra the previous year) at the Oslo Spectrum entitled "Forces of the Northern Night". This was broadcast live on Norway's main national TV carrier NRK. The setlist for this show consisted of tracks from the band's recent transfiguration Abrahadabra, leading tracks "Vredysbyrd" and "Progenies of the Great Apocalypse" from Death Cult Armageddon, as well as newly updated versions of tracks from their standard back catalog; "The Serpentine Offering", "Kings of the Carnival Creation", and "Mourning Palace" which were re-orchestrated by Gaute Storaas. The band played a similar show the following year at the Wacken Open Air festival, having yet performed a second live show with a symphony orchestra and choir. This time, they were accompanied by the Czech National Orchestra with the same choir, being the second band in the festival's history to play with a live orchestra and choir (next to German power metal band Rage's 2007 performance). The show was broadcast live on Germany's Kultur TV arts channel. Silenoz has also said in several recent interviews that both live sets have been fully mixed and will be accompanied by a feature-length documentary and bonus material when released. In late 2011-2012 the band went on a special tour for fans in various European countries, including playing in some small, intimate venues celebrating their 1997 album Enthrone Darkness Triumphant by playing the album in its entirety, alongside an additional set of various fan favourite tracks, following a poll to fans directly, asking which of their first 3 albums would they want to see played in full on their next European tour.

Forces of the Northern Night and Eonian
The band originally announced in August 2013 that work had commenced on the band's next album. However, the production and release of the album has faced numerous delays. It will mark the longest-ever gap between each studio release. Following various delays, the Oslo and Wacken Orchestra performances, recorded between 2011 and 2012, were released on CD/DVD/Blu-ray format on 28 April 2017 worldwide as their third live video release titled Forces of the Northern Night. Silenoz recently revealed that the band is in the mixing stage of the follow-up to Abrahadabra. Ten songs will feature on the next album and they have said it has since been completed. On 18 December 2017 it was announced that the first single from the new album will be initially released on a 7-inch vinyl EP, and will be titled Interdimensional Summit, and was released on 23 February 2018. The new album was titled Eonian and was released on 4 May through Nuclear Blast, and marked the band's first new release of original material in almost eight years. A second song from the new album, "Council of Wolves and Snakes", was made available for streaming online on 30 March. On 28 May, it was announced that Victor Brandt (Entombed A.D., Firespawn) had officially joined as the band's new bassist.

Eleventh studio album

According to recent updates on the band member's Instagram accounts, the band are now in the process of writing and pre-production for their eleventh studio album. Silenoz has stated in a recent interview that the band would not take as long to release their next album.

Influences and musical style
Dimmu Borgir's older releases (since 1994 to 1999) are, according to AllMusic journalist Bradley Torreano, strongly influenced by Darkthrone, Mayhem, Bathory, Emperor, Celtic Frost, Immortal, Venom, and Iron Maiden. The band became more progressive and symphonic through the years; many black metal purists consider the band's second album, Stormblåst, to be "the act's last true contribution to black metal". Enthrone Darkness Triumphant, Dimmu Borgir's third album, "distinguished itself in two important areas, firstly forgoing their native language for English and secondly for its dramatic increase in synthesizer content." Significant experimentation began with 1999's Spiritual Black Dimensions (due to the addition of Vortex's clean vocals, and the variety of musical ideas from then-new member Mustis), as well as Puritanical Euphoric Misanthropia due to addition of influences from composers such as Antonín Dvořák, Enya, Richard Wagner, and Frédéric Chopin. As the music strongly differed from the older, rawer black metal style, Jon "Metalion" Kristiansen called Spiritual Black Dimensions "a fine case of melodic, over-produced symphonic metal. If you like this melodic style I can't really think of anyone doing it better [...]. No, I wouldn't call this black metal. Read the interview with Funeral Mist for the right definition of black metal."

Discography

For all tid (1995)
Stormblåst (1996)
Enthrone Darkness Triumphant (1997)
Spiritual Black Dimensions (1999)
Puritanical Euphoric Misanthropia (2001)
Death Cult Armageddon (2003)
Stormblåst MMV (2005)
In Sorte Diaboli (2007)
Abrahadabra (2010)
Eonian (2018)

Members

Current official members
Silenoz – rhythm guitar , lead vocals , bass 
Shagrath – lead vocals , drums , lead guitar , keyboards, synthesizers , bass 
Galder – lead guitar , bass

Current session/touring members
Daray – drums 
Gerlioz – keyboards, synthesizers 
Victor Brandt – bass

References

External links

 
Norwegian symphonic black metal musical groups
Musical groups established in 1993
1993 establishments in Norway
Spellemannprisen winners
Musical groups from Oslo
People from Jessheim
Nuclear Blast artists
Articles which contain graphical timelines